Duck Mountain Provincial Park may refer to
Duck Mountain Provincial Park (Manitoba)
Duck Mountain Provincial Park (Saskatchewan)